The Scotsman is a Scottish compact newspaper and daily news website headquartered in Edinburgh. First established as a radical political paper in 1817, it began daily publication in 1855 and remained a broadsheet until August 2004. Its parent company, JPIMedia, also publishes the Edinburgh Evening News. It had an audited print circulation of 16,349 for July to December 2018. Its website, Scotsman.com, had an average of 138,000 unique visitors a day as of 2017. The title celebrated its bicentenary on 25 January 2017.

History

The Scotsman was conceived in 1816 and first launched on 25 January 1817 as a liberal weekly newspaper by lawyer William Ritchie and customs official Charles Maclaren in response to the "unblushing subservience" of competing newspapers to the Edinburgh establishment. These two plus John Ramsay McCulloch were co-founders of the venture. 

The paper was pledged to "impartiality, firmness and independence". The price was originally 6d plus 4d tax. After the abolition of newspaper stamp tax in Scotland in 1855, The Scotsman was relaunched as a daily newspaper priced at 1d and a circulation of 6,000 copies.

The fledgling paper was originally based at 257 High Street on the Royal Mile. Until 1860 the Scotsman was co-housed with the Caledonian Mercury newspaper.

In 1860, The Scotsman obtained a purpose built office on Cockburn Street in Edinburgh designed in the Scots baronial style by the architects Peddie & Kinnear. This backed onto their original offices on the Royal Mile. The building bears the initials "JR" for John Ritchie, the founder of the company. On 19 December 1904, they moved to huge new offices at the top of the street, facing onto North Bridge, designed by Dunn & Findlay (Findlay being the son of the then owner). This huge building had taken three years to build and also had connected printworks on Market Street (now the City Art Centre). The printworks connected below road level direct to Waverley station in a highly efficient production line.

In 1953 the newspaper was bought by Canadian millionaire Roy Thomson who was in the process of building a large media group.  The paper was bought in 1995 by David and Frederick Barclay for £85 million. They moved the newspaper from its Edinburgh office on North Bridge, which is now an upmarket hotel, to modern offices in Holyrood Road designed by Edinburgh architects CDA, near the subsequent location of the Scottish Parliament Building. The daily was awarded by the Society for News Design (SND) the World's Best Designed Newspaper™ for 1994.

In December 2005, The Scotsman along with its sister titles owned by The Scotsman Publications Ltd was acquired, in a £160million deal, by Johnston Press, a company founded in Scotland and at the time one of the top three largest local newspaper publishers in the UK. Ian Stewart has been the editor since June 2012, after a reshuffle of senior management in April 2012 during which John McLellan who was the paper's editor-in-chief was dismissed.  Ian Stewart was previously editor of Edinburgh Evening News and remains as the editor of Scotland on Sunday.

In 2012, The Scotsman was named Newspaper of the Year at the Scottish Press Awards.

In 2006 Barclay Brothers sold Barclay House to Irish property magnate Lochlann Quinn, and in 2013 Scottish video games maker Rockstar North, of Grand Theft Auto fame, signed the lease, causing Johnston Press group to move out in June 2014. Johnston Press have downsized to refurbished premises at Orchard Brae House in Queensferry Road, Edinburgh, a move which was quoted as saving the group £1million per annum in rent.

The newspaper backed a 'No' vote in the referendum on Scottish independence.

In November 2018, Johnston Press filed for administration.  Shortly after filing for administration, the company was bought out by JPIMedia, a company which was bought by former Daily Mirror exec David Montgomery's new National World group in 2020.

Editors
1817: William Ritchie
1817: Charles Maclaren
1818: John Ramsay McCulloch
1843: John Hill Burton (acting)
1846: Alexander Russel
1876: Robert Wallace
1880: Charles Alfred Cooper
1905: John Pettigrew Croal
1924: George A. Waters
1944: James Murray Watson
1955: John Buchanan (acting)
1956: Alastair Dunnett
1972: Eric MacKay
1985: Chris Baur
1988: Magnus Linklater
1994: Andrew Jaspan
1995: James Seaton
1997: Martin Clarke
1998: Alan Ruddock
2000: Tim Luckhurst
2000: Rebecca Hardy
2001: Iain Martin
2004: John McGurk
2006: Mike Gilson
2009: John McLellan
2012: Ian Stewart
2017: Frank O'Donnell
2020: Euan McGrory
2021: Neil McIntosh

See also
 List of newspapers in Scotland
 List of newspapers by date

References

Further reading
 Merrill, John C. and Harold A. Fisher. The world's great dailies: profiles of fifty newspapers (1980) pp 273–79

External links

 
 The Scotsman Digital Archive 1817–1950
 Johnston Press
 Comprehensive Design Architects

 
1817 establishments in Scotland
19th century in Scotland
Mass media in Edinburgh
Newspapers published in Scotland
Newspapers with Scottish Gaelic content
Publications established in 1817
Scottish brands
Newspapers published by Johnston Press
British news websites